James Anderson and Randolph Lycett were the defending champions, but Anderson did not participate. Lycett partnered with Leslie Godfree and  defeated Eduardo Flaquer and Manuel de Gomar in the final, 6–3, 6–4, 3–6, 6–3 to win the gentlemen's doubles tennis title at the 1923 Wimbledon Championships.

Draw

Finals

Top half

Section 1

The nationality of NB Deane is unknown.

Section 2

Bottom half

Section 3

Section 4

References

External links

Men's Doubles
Wimbledon Championship by year – Men's doubles